The women's individual pursuit class C4 track cycling event at the 2020 Summer Paralympics was contested on 25 August 2021 at the Izu Velodrome, Japan. This class is for the cyclist who has impairments that affect their legs, arms, and/or trunk; they are still able to use a standard bicycle. 6 cyclist from 5 nations will be competing in this event.

Competition format
The competition begins off with the qualifying round where all 6 cyclist are divided into 3 heat, each heat containing 2 cyclists, they compete individually in a time trial basis. The 2 fastest in the qualifying round would qualify to the gold medal final while the 3rd and 4th fastest will qualify to the bronze medal final. The distance of this event is 3000m. The events' finals are held on the same day as the qualifying round.

Schedule

Records

Results

Qualifying

Finals

References

Women's pursuit C4